Seeds of Change is Kerry Livgren's first solo album. Released in 1980 while he still was a member of Kansas, it features guest appearances by three fellow Kansas members: Steve Walsh, Phil Ehart and Robby Steinhardt. Singer Ronnie James Dio and members of LeRoux, Jethro Tull, Ambrosia, and Atlanta Rhythm Section are also featured. In 1996, Seeds of Change was reissued by Renaissance Records with an interview with Livgren as a bonus track.

Background
Seeds of Change marked a new chapter in Livgren's music. It was recorded after Kerry Livgren had converted to Christianity in 1979. His religious beliefs began to be reflected in the song lyrics of Kansas album, Vinyl Confessions, as well as Seeds of Change. This eventually would cause tension within the band.

The inclusion of Ronnie James Dio, who was Black Sabbath's lead vocalist at the time, caused controversy, as Black Sabbath is considered satanic by some Christians. Livgren wrote that he chose Dio "strictly on the basis of his vocal abilities" as well as stating in the liner notes for Seeds Of Change that Dio "is no Satanist".

Track listing
All songs written by Kerry Livgren
Side one
"Just One Way" – 5:45
"Mask of the Great Deceiver" – 7:34
"How Can You Live" – 4:12
"Whiskey Seed" – 5:33

Side two
"To Live for the King" – 4:55
"Down to the Core" – 5:18
"Ground Zero" – 8:33

Personnel
 "Just One Way" (track 1);

 Drums - Barriemore Barlow
 Bass - Paul Goddard
 Trumpets and percussion - Bobby Campo
 Lead vocals - Jeff Pollard
 Background vocals - Jeff Pollard, Mylon LeFevre, John Fristoe
 guitars, piano, synthesizers - Kerry Livgren

 "Mask of the Great Deceiver" (track 2);

 Drums - Barriemore Barlow
 Bass - Paul Goddard
 vocals - Ronnie James Dio
 Guitars, synthesizers - Kerry Livgren

 "How Can You Live?" (track 3);

 Drums - Barriemore Barlow
 Tambourine - Bobby Campo
 Background vocals - John Fristoe, Joey Jelf, Mylon LeFevre
 Lead vocals - Steve Walsh
 Bass, guitars, piano, organ, synthesizers - Kerry Livgren

 "Whiskey Seed" (track 4);

 Drums - Phil Ehart
 Bass - Paul Goddard
 Vocals - Kerry Livgren, Mylon LeFevre
 Harmonica - Darryl Kutz
 Background vocals - "The Moaning Multitudes"
 Guitars, mongo drums - Kerry Livgren

 "To Live For the King" (track 5);

 Drums - John Thompson
 Bass - Gary Gilbert
 Lead vocals - Ronnie James Dio
 Background vocals - Joey Jelf, Steve Walsh, Donna Williams
 Guitars - Kerry Livgren

 "Down to the Core" (track 6);

 Drums - Barriemore Barlow
 Lead vocals - Davy Moire
 Background vocals - Victoria Livgren
 Horns - Bobby Campo
 Bass, guitars, clavinet, Fender Rhodes - Kerry Livgren

 "Ground Zero" (track 7);

 Drums - Phil Ehart
 Lead vocals - David Pack
 Background vocals - Donna Williams, Brad Aaron, Mylon LeFevre, Davy Moire, Steve Venezia
 Violins - Robby Steinhardt
 Gong - John Thompson
 Piano, guitars, synthesizers, percussion - Kerry Livgren

References

Footnotes

Bibliography
 

1980 debut albums
Kerry Livgren albums